The Canada men's national ice hockey team will participate in various events during the 2009–10 ice hockey season.

News and notes
June 29, 2009: Hockey hall of famer Jean Béliveau was named an honorary Team Canada member and honorary captain of Canada's 2010 Men's Olympic Hockey Team. Béliveau was honoured at a press conference, which was part of a Hockey Canada Foundation fundraiser. Serge Savard and Yvan Cournoyer presented Béliveau with a Team Canada jersey.
February 28: After winning the gold medal, Canada has once again earned the number one ranking in the IIHF Women's World Ranking. Canada's men are also ranked first in the IIHF Men's World Ranking.

IIHF World Jr. Championships
Canada hosted the 2010 World Junior Ice Hockey Championships from December 26, 2009, to January 5, 2010. The Canada roster included 21 NHL draft picks, including 10 first round selections. Of note, Jordan Eberle passed John Tavares as Canada's all-time leading goal scorer in the World Junior Hockey Tournament with 14 goals.

Roster
Head coach:  Willie Desjardins

Preliminary round

Medal round
Semifinals

Gold medal game

2010 Winter Olympics

Roster

Standings

Gold medal game
Canada faced off against the United States on February 28, 2010. The teams were tied after regulation, with goals scored by Jonathan Toews and Corey Perry for Canada and Ryan Kesler and Zach Parise for USA; Parise scored with 25 seconds remaining in the third period to the game. In overtime, Sidney Crosby scored seven minutes in and won the gold medal for Canada.

The gold medal game was the last event of the Olympics.

Schedule

Paralympic Games
Canada will assemble a team to compete in ice sledge hockey at the 2010 Winter Paralympics.

Standings

All times are local (UTC-8).

Roster

Schedule

IIHF World Championships
Canada will compete at the 2010 Men's World Ice Hockey Championships to be held in Germany from May 7 to May 23. Canada will be in Group B with Italy, Latvia and Switzerland.

Roster
To be determined

Schedule
To be determined

Awards and honours
Jordan Eberle, Most Valuable Player, 2010 IIHF World Junior Tournament
Jordan Eberle, Media All-Star Team, 2010 IIHF World Junior Tournament
Alex Pietrangelo, Best Defenseman, 2010 IIHF World Junior Tournament
 Alex Pietrangelo, Media All-Star Team, 2010 IIHF World Junior Tournament
 Jonathan Toews, Media All-Star Team, Vancouver 2010 games
Jonathan Toews, IIHF Directorate Awards, Best Forward, Vancouver 2010 OIympics
 Shea Weber, Media All-Star Team, Vancouver 2010 games

See also
 Canada men's national ice hockey team
 Ice hockey at the 2010 Winter Olympics
 Ice hockey at the Olympic Games
 List of Canadian national ice hockey team rosters

References

Canada men's national ice hockey team seasons
 
Canada men